Surachet Ngamtip (born February 1, 1991), simply known as Draft, is a Thai retired professional footballer who played as a left-back.

International career

He debuted for U-19 team in 2010 AFC U-19 Championship. Surachet was called up to the national team by Bryan Robson. In 2013, he was called up to the national team by Surachai Jaturapattarapong to the 2015 AFC Asian Cup qualification.
In October, 2013 he played a friendly match against Bahrain. 
In October 15, 2013 he played against Iran in the 2015 AFC Asian Cup qualification.

International

International goals

Under-19

Honours

International
Thailand U-19
 AFF U-19 Youth Championship: 2009

References

External links
 Profile at Goal

1991 births
Living people
Surachet Ngamtip
Surachet Ngamtip
Association football defenders
Surachet Ngamtip
Surachet Ngamtip
Surachet Ngamtip
Surachet Ngamtip
Footballers at the 2010 Asian Games
Surachet Ngamtip